The Palm Beach Knights are a professional minor league basketball team based in West Palm Beach, Florida. The Knights compete in the Florida Basketball Association.

History 
Formed in 2011 as the Palm Beach Titans, the team joined the new FBA for its inaugural season in 2012. The team would rebrand as the Knights for the 2013 season.

The Knights would capture their first league championship in 2018 defeating the Space Coast Stars in the finals in two-straight games.

Season-by-season

References

External links
@PBKnights561

Basketball teams in Florida
Sports in West Palm Beach, Florida
Basketball teams established in 2011
2011 establishments in Florida